Estádio Municipal Alfredo Chiavegato is a multi-use stadium in Jaguariúna, São Paulo, Brazil.  It is currently used mostly for football matches.  The stadium has a capacity of 15,000 spectators and it opened in 1996.

References

Municipal Alfredo Chiavegato
Sports venues in São Paulo (state)